Caroline Greenhank Boughton (August 9, 1854 - 1905) was an American educator and philanthropist.

Early life
Caroline Greenhank was born in Philadelphia, Pennsylvania, on August 9, 1854. She was the second daughter of Judge Thomas Greenbank of that city, whose family was of English extraction, a family devout and scholarly, represented in each generation by divines and jurists of superior order. Through her mother, she was related to a branch of the north of Ireland gentry, the Huestons of Belfast.

Greenhank graduated from the Philadelphia Normal School in 1874, fifth in a class of eighty.

Career
In the autumn of 1874, Caroline G. Boughton began her career as a teacher in Miss Steven's Seminary, Germantown, Philadelphia. In 1878 she took charge of the department of history in the Philadelphia Normal School, which position she filled for four years, winning by her talents and enthusiasm an enviable reputation in her profession, and by her charming manners the affectionate regard of all who came under her influence.

Boughton, in her connection with the American Home Missionary Society of the M. E. Church, became especially interested in Indian Missions and was early chosen a manager of the Women's National Indian Association, a position she filled during five years. That office she exchanged later for that of auditor of the association.

She was an active member of the Woman's Christian Temperance Union until failing health obliged her to curb her energies in that direction. Boughton was always deeply interested in the advancement of women. She was a member of the New Century Club (Philadelphia), and was also a member of the National Woman Suffrage Association, and an earnest advocate of the principles which that body represented.

Personal life
On July 25, 1882, Caroline Greenhank married John W. Boughton (1842-1920), a prominent manufacturer and inventor of Philadelphia. 

She died in 1905 and is buried at West Laurel Hill Cemetery, Bala Cynwyd.

References

1854 births
1905 deaths
Burials at West Laurel Hill Cemetery
Educators from Philadelphia
19th-century American women educators
19th-century American philanthropists
Wikipedia articles incorporating text from A Woman of the Century
19th-century American educators